CK Banska Bystrica is a UCI Continental team founded in 2011 and based in Slovakia. It participates in UCI Continental Circuits races.

References

UCI Continental Teams (Europe)
Cycling teams established in 2011
Cycling teams based in Slovakia